Sudirman (born 24 April 1969) is an Indonesian football player and manager who previously plays as defender for Arseto Solo and the Indonesia national team.

International career
In 1991 Sudirman's international career began. He represented his country numerous times, finding the net multiple times.

International goals

|}

Honours

Manager
Persija Jakarta
 Menpora Cup: 2021

References

External links
 

1969 births
Association football defenders
Living people
Indonesian footballers
Indonesian football managers
Indonesia international footballers
Arseto F.C. players
Place of birth missing (living people)
Southeast Asian Games gold medalists for Indonesia
Southeast Asian Games medalists in football
Competitors at the 1991 Southeast Asian Games
People from Pekanbaru
Sportspeople from Riau